Leutnant Friedrich von Mallinckrodt (15 August 1894 – 02 August 1941) was a German World War I test pilot and flying ace credited with six aerial victories.

Biography

Early life
Friedrich von Mallinckrodt was born on 15 August 1894 in Essen, the German Empire.

Military service

Friedrich von Mallinckrodt served in the infantry in the 70th Regiment of Foot, in which he enlisted before the war. In May 1915, he was commissioned as a Leutnant. On July 6, 1915 he transferred to the Luftstreitkräfte. On December 12, 1915, he was the pilot on the first test flight of the Junkers J 1, the world's first all-metal aircraft. 

After training, beginning in January 1916, he served in the 5th Kagohl, a tactical bomber wing. By April 1916, he was transferred to an ad hoc fighter unit, Kampfeinsitzerkommando Sivry (Combat Single-Seater Command Sivry). While near Verdun on 30 April, he claimed his first enemy aircraft shot down; the victory went unconfirmed. On 10 September, he was posted to a fighter squadron, Jagdstaffel 6. He would not score his first official victory until 28 October 1916, when he downed a Caudron over Villeselve. Once returned to Jasta 6, he had another unconfirmed victory on 30 December 1916.

Mallinckrodt scored his second confirmed win, over a Sopwith 1 1/2 Strutter on 4 January 1917. His combat career was interrupted by a brief stint as an instructor at the Jastaschule at Valenciennes. He then transferred to another fighter squadron, Jagdstaffel 20. In March 1917, he got four confirmed victories in an eight-day stretch, to bring his total tally to six. On 30 April, he was wounded for the fifth time; this one was severe enough to remove him from combat duty. After recovery, he was assigned to the Technical Commission of the Luftstreitkräfte for the remainder of the war.

Friedrich Mallinckrodt was awarded the Knight's Cross of the House Order of Hohenzollern. As German medals were awarded in a progressive fashion, this meant that he almost certainly won both classes of the Iron Cross. Also, five wounds should have qualified him for the Wound Badge.

Later life

Following WWI, Mallinckrodt was employed by Fokker as a test pilot.  He began an affair with Anthony Fokker's wife Elisabeth "Tetta" von Morgen, precipitating Fokker to divorce her, effective October 11, 1923.  Mallinckrodt and Tetta were married in Berlin on December 18, 1923, but their marriage lasted only two years.

During the Second World War he served as a Major at the Luftwaffe Air Force Test Center at Rechlin–Lärz Airfield. He died in a plane crash August 2, 1941 northeast of Rechlin and was buried in the Südwestkirchhof in Stahnsdorf, Germany.

References

 Franks, Norman; Bailey, Frank W.; Guest, Russell. Above the Lines: The Aces and Fighter Units of the German Air Service, Naval Air Service and Flanders Marine Corps, 1914–1918. Grub Street, 1993. , .

1894 births
1941 deaths
German World War I flying aces
Military personnel from Essen
Luftwaffe personnel killed in World War II